Validator  may refer to:
 Validator,  a computer program used to check the validity or syntactical correctness of a fragment of code or document. 
 Validator (blockchain), an entity involved in committing the blocks into a proof-of-stake blockchain.
 Validator (comics), a team member in Omega Flight comics.